Gol Maal is a 1979 Indian Hindi-language comedy film directed by Hrishikesh Mukherjee and written by Rahi Masoom Raza and Sachin Bhowmick. It was produced by N. C. Sippy, with music by R. D. Burman. The film won several awards and was praised by critics.

The film was an inspiration for the Hindi movie Bol Bachchan (2012) which was remade in Telugu as Masala (2013).

Plot 
Ramprasad Dashrathprasad Sharma, a qualified CA, is looking for a job. He and his sister Ratna have no relatives or acquaintances except Dr. Kedar. Dr. Kedar tells him about an opening at Bhavani Shankar's firm known as Urmila Traders.

Sharma is fond of sports and music. Shankar is a man of traditional values. He hates youth wearing modern clothes. He does not think highly of youth spending time on sport. But his weirdest trait is hatred towards men without moustaches. He thinks they are characterless.

Sharma has a moustache. Following the advice of Dr. Kedar, he appears for the interview wearing a kurta and feigning ignorance about sports. Shankar hires him immediately. Sharma is a hardworking man, so he does well under Shankar. However, one day he takes leave to watch a hockey match by pretending that his mother (who died many years ago) has fallen ill. Bhavani Shankar, who attends the match, sees him there.

The next day, Shankar summons Sharma to his office and questions him about the hockey match. Remembering the plot of a movie a friend of his is shooting, Sharma convinces Bhavani Shankar that he had seen his "moustache-less" identical twin Lakshmanprasad Dashrathprasad Sharma, aka Lucky at the stadium.

Bhavani Shankar buys his argument and feels bad about accusing him. He makes amends by hiring Lucky to teach his daughter Urmila music. Sharma reluctantly shaves his moustache to become Lucky and starts to teach Urmila. He is helped by his actor friend Deven Verma.

Urmila is the exact opposite of her father. She takes an immediate liking to the Lucky persona. Her father notices this and decides to get her married to Ramprasad, which she is unhappy about. Eventually, Sharma tells Urmila the truth. Together, they decide to tell Shankar that Lucky ran away and that Sharma and Urmila wish to get married. However, Shankar sees Sharma's fake moustache and thinks that Lucky murdered Sharma and impersonated him to marry Urmila. Sharma and Urmila try to flee from Shankar in a car chase in which Shankar gets arrested.

On coming home, he finds that Urmila and Sharma are married. He refuses to give them his blessing, until Dr. Kedar comes to the scene and explains the situation. The film ends with a family photo of everyone and Bhavani (who has now shaved his moustache).

Cast

Soundtrack 
The music of the film was composed by R. D. Burman and lyrics were written by Gulzar.

Track listing

Production 
Hrishikesh Mukherjee had first selected Rekha to enact the heroine's part, but felt that he would be wasting a talented actress in a film where the hero was the mainstay. He replaced her with Bindiya Goswami. The whole film was shot in 40 working days.

Remakes 

David Dhawan's 2002 film Chor Machaaye Shor had many scenes plagiarised from Gol Maal. The 2012 film Bol Bachchan, directed by Rohit Shetty is loosely based on Gol Maal. It was also later remade in Telugu as Masala. The Malayalam movie Ayalvasi Oru Daridravasi'' had few scenes adapted from Gol Maal. Simhavalan Menon movie is also a remake of this film

Awards 

 27th Filmfare Awards:

Won

 Best Actor – Amol Palekar
 Best Comedian – Utpal Dutt
 Best Lyricist – Gulzar for "Aane Wala Pal"

Nominated

 Best Director – Hrishikesh Mukherjee
 Best Supporting Actor – Utpal Dutt
 Best Supporting Actress – Dina Pathak
 Best Comedian – Deven Verma
 Best Story – Sailesh Dey

References

External links 
 
 

1979 films
1979 comedy films
Films scored by R. D. Burman
1970s Hindi-language films
Indian comedy films
Films directed by Hrishikesh Mukherjee
Hindi films remade in other languages
Films with screenplays by Sachin Bhowmick
Hindi-language comedy films